Toshiki is a masculine Japanese given name.

Possible writings
Toshiki can be written using different combinations of kanji characters. Some examples: 

敏樹, "agile, tree"
敏生, "agile, birth"
敏喜, "agile, rejoice"
敏起, "agile, to rise"
敏機, "agile, opportunity"
敏輝, "agile, to shine"
敏基, "agile, foundation"
俊樹, "talented, tree"
俊喜, "talented, rejoice"
俊輝, "talented, to shine"
利樹, "benefit, tree"
寿樹, "long life, tree"
寿輝, "long life, to shine"
淑樹, "graceful, tree"
年希, "year, to hope"

The name can also be written in hiragana としき or katakana トシキ.

Notable people with the name

, Japanese baseball player
, Japanese footballer
, Japanese sumo wrestler
, Japanese anime director
, Japanese screenwriter
, Japanese musician
, Japanese politician and Prime Minister of Japan
, Japanese footballer
, Japanese equestrian
, Japanese footballer
, Japanese playwright, theatre director and writer
, Japanese photographer
, Japanese film director and screenwriter
, Japanese footballer
Toshiki Yamamoto (山本 俊樹, born 1991), Japanese weightlifter
, Japanese drifting driver
, Japanese manga artist

Japanese masculine given names